Baba Zaheen Shah Yousufi Taji (1902 – 23 July 1978), born Muhammad Tuaseen, was a great sufi of sub-continent as well as an Urdu poet, philosopher and scholar of high repute.

Biography 
He was born in Jhunjhunu, Rajasthan India. He was in direct lineage from Caliph Umar Farooq and was adapted in Chishtia he was also part of family of Great sufi Saint Khawaja Hameed uddin Nagori who adopt order of Sufism by Syed Muhammad Moinuddin Chishti Ajmeri. Zaheen Shah Taji was the disciple of Baba Yousuf Shah Taji, who was disciple of Tajuddin Baba of Nagpur.

Literary skill

He has written many books  and Ghazals in Urdu language while he knew Persian, Arabic, English and Hindi languages as well. He used Zaheen as a pen name in his poetry.

Works and influence

Zaheen Shah Baba translated two important works of Ibn Arabi Fusus-ul-Hukm and Fatuhat al-Makiyyah and also translated Al-Hallaj's Kitab-ut-Tawaseen in Urdu amongst many other books in Urdu and Persian the most prominent being the Taj-ul-Auliya (biography of Baba Tajuddin of Nagpur. 
Prominent scholars who used to attend his gatherings were Maulana Mahir-ul-Qadri, Prof. A. B. A. Haleem, Prof. Karrar Hussain, Maulana Kausar Niazi, Hasrat Kasganjvi, Jaun Elia, Faiz Ahmad Faiz, Ahmad Faraz, Raghib Muradabadi, Ilyas Ishqui, Abul Khair Kashfi, Josh Malihabadi, Rais Amrohvi and Syed Muhammad Taqi.

His poetry books Āyāt-i Jamāl, Lam Aat-e-Jamal, Jamal-e-Ayyaat, Ajmaal-e-Jamaal are vary famous in the Urdu poetry circles. He had also written a book about his grand pir-o-murshid Hazarat baba Tajuddin Auliya Nagpuri's life and events with the name of Tajul Auliya. His Books in pdf format are available on Internet which can be linked through face book page of Baba Zaheen Shah Taji (RA) Foundation.

See also
 List of Pakistani poets
 List of Urdu language poets

References

External links
 Taj Baba

Pakistani Sufi religious leaders
Pakistani scholars
Sufi poets
1902 births
1978 deaths
Pakistani philosophers
Pakistani religious leaders
Pakistani Sufis
Urdu-language poets from Pakistan
Pakistani people of Rajasthani descent
Writers from Karachi
20th-century Islamic religious leaders
20th-century Pakistani poets
20th-century Muslim scholars of Islam
20th-century Pakistani philosophers